The 2008–09 CONCACAF Champions League preliminary round took place between 26 August 2008 and 4 September 2008. The eight winners advanced to the Group Stage.

Summary

|}

Matches 

All times local

First leg

Second leg

References 

Preliminary Round, 2008-09 Concacaf Champions League